Qimen Dunjia is an ancient form of divination from China. It is still in use in Mainland China, Taiwan, Hong Kong, Macau, Malaysia, Singapore and the Chinese diaspora in Southeast Asia. It is one of the Three Styles of Chinese divination, with Da Liu Ren and Tai Yi Shen Shu.

History 

Originally devised to help form military strategy and tactics, Qimen Dunjia was in use as long ago as the period of Chinese history known as the Warring States, and is believed by Chinese scholars to have been used at the Battle of Red Cliffs in the defeat of Cao Cao's ship-borne army.

Liu Bowen is believed to have secured the throne for the Ming dynasty's Hongwu Emperor by applying Qimen Dunjia to his strategic planning.

Over the centuries of Chinese history, Qimen Dunjia grew in popularity and was expanded to include a number of other types of divination, including medical divination, matchmaking, childbirth, travel, personal fortunes, and today includes contemporary applications, most notably that of business and finance. Today Qimen Dunjia is especially popular in Singapore and other nations of Southeast Asia.

Technique

Qimen Dunjia is based on astronomical observations, and consists of various aspects of Chinese metaphysics, including the doctrines of yin and yang, five elements, the eight trigrams, the ten Heavenly Stems and the twelve Earthly Branches, as well as the twenty-four solar terms.

The Qimen Dunjia cosmic board consists of a 3 × 3 magic square of nine palaces, which includes a Heaven and Earth plate, a spirit plate, eight gates and a star plate. The various symbols rotate around the palaces with each double-hour of the day, making a total of 1,080 different configurations of the Qimen Dunjia cosmic board. These situations are recycled four times per year, and are divided between the Yin and Yang halves of the year.

Each type of Qimen Dunjia divination carries its unique set of Use Spirits. For example, medical divination relies mainly upon the star plate. The task of the Qimen Dunjia analyst is to interpret and analyze the meanings of the symbols in relation to questions asked. Any Qimen Dunjia situation may be interpreted or analyzed to respond to a wide variety of questions, or to solve a multitude of problems. Examples of questions include understanding the underlying objective of the other party in a situation, looking for missing objects, and analyzing cause and effects.

Qimen Dunjia is time-sensitive. The analyst makes reference to the configuration of the cosmic board at the time when a question is posed, or for birth times of individuals or corporate entities, such as businesses or nations. At times, the same or very similar configurations of the cosmic board will appear in relation to the same series of questions or problems.

In popular culture

Animation

Chinese Donghua/Comic
Under One Person:Qimen Dunjia

Japanese Anime/Manga
Naruto:Eight Gates
Ya Boy Kongming!

Movie
The Thousand Faces of Dunjia (2017)
The Miracle Fighters (1982)

See also 

Chinese astrology
Chinese astronomy
Chinese classical texts
Da Liu Ren
Feng shui
Flying Star Feng Shui
Hypernumbers
I Ching & I Ching divination
Wen Wang Gua
Jiaobei & Poe divination
Kau Cim
Jiutian Xuannü, Powerful female Deity in Chinese folk religion
Shaobing Song
Tai Yi Shen Shu
Tie Ban Shen Shu
Tui bei tu
Tung Shing
Yuan Hai Zi Ping

Further reading

External links
 

Chinese books of divination
Chinese culture
Divination
Taoist divination